The Wolfsburg Volkswagen Factory is the worldwide headquarters of the Volkswagen Group, and one of the largest manufacturing plants in the world, in terms of area at just under 6.5 million m² (70 million sq ft). The Wolfsburg plant produced 815,000 cars in 2015. Volkswagen's currywurst is also produced at this facility.

Cars produced

 Volkswagen Golf
 Volkswagen Golf Sportsvan
 Volkswagen Golf Variant
 Volkswagen Golf R
 Volkswagen Golf GTI
 Volkswagen Golf GTE
 Volkswagen e-Golf
 Volkswagen Touran
 Volkswagen Tiguan
 SEAT Tarraco

See also
 Autostadt
 Ford Kansas City Assembly Plant
 Volkswagen currywurst

References

Golf
Motor vehicle assembly plants in Germany
Buildings and structures in Wolfsburg